The Scientists: An Epic of Discovery (2012), edited by Andrew Robinson, is a collection of 43 biographies of a selection of the greatest scientists of all time. An updated paperback edition of the book entitled The Scientists: Pioneers of Discovery appeared in 2023.

Overview
The book's chapters are contributed by various authors and cover the following scientists (some in pairs) in a number of parts:

Universe
 Nicolaus Copernicus
 Johannes Kepler
 Galileo Galilei
 Isaac Newton
 Michael Faraday
 James Clerk Maxwell
 Albert Einstein
 Edwin Powell Hubble

Earth
 James Hutton
 Charles Lyell
 Alexander von Humboldt
 Alfred Wegener

Molecules and matter
 Robert Boyle
 Antoine-Laurent de Lavoisier
 John Dalton
 Dmitri Mendeleev
 August Kekulé
 Dorothy Crowfoot Hodgkin
 Chandrasekhara Venkata Raman

Inside the atom
 Marie Curie and Pierre Curie
 Ernest Rutherford
 Niels Bohr
 Linus Carl Pauling
 Enrico Fermi
 Hideki Yukawa

Life
 Carl Linnaeus
 Jan IngenHousz
 Charles Darwin
 Gregor Mendel
 Jan Purkinje
 Santiago Ramón y Cajal
 Francis Crick and James Watson

Body and mind
 Andreas Vesalius
 William Harvey
 Louis Pasteur
 Francis Galton
 Sigmund Freud
 Alan Turing
 John von Neumann
 Louis Leakey and Mary Leakey

Translations
The book has been translated into a number of languages other than English:

 Czech: Vědci, Slovart, 2013.
 Dutch: De Grote Wetenschappers, Fontaine Uitgevers, 2013.
 German: Faszination Forschung, Parthas Verlag, 2013.
 Japanese: 世界の科学者図鑑, Hara Shobo, 2013.
 Korean: The Great Scientists / 위대한 과학자들, Knowledge Gallery, 2012.
 Spanish: Los Grandes Científicos, Lunwerg Editores, 2012.
 Turkish: Bilim Insanlari, Yapı Kredi Yayınları, 2013.
 Vietnamese: Những Nhà Khoa Học, Kim Đồng Publishing House, 2017.

Reviews
The book has been reviewed in a number of publications and online, including:

 Amazon
 The Bulletin of The Royal College of Pathologists
 Choice
 The Irish Times
 The Lancet
 Nature
 San Francisco Book Review
 Science News
 The Scotsman

References

2012 non-fiction books
21st-century history books
Books about scientists
Thames & Hudson books